Another Destination is the third solo album by John Norum--best known as the guitarist of the Swedish hard rock band Europe. It was released on 23 May 1995.

The album features two cover versions: "Strange Days" originally recorded by Humble Pie and "Sunshine of Your Love" by Cream.

Track listing
 "Inside" (John Norum, Alan Lorber, Michelle Meldrum) – 5:06 
 "Resurrection Time" (J. Norum, Kelly Keeling, A. Lorber) – 5:05 
 "Strange Days" (Steve Marriott) – 4:59 
 "Spirit World" (J. Norum, K. Keeling, Scott Bender) – 5:16 
 "Shimmering Highs" (J. Norum) – 6:10 
 "Whose Side Are You On?" (J. Norum, K. Keeling) – 5:02 
 "Sunshine of Your Love" (Jack Bruce, Pete Brown, Eric Clapton) – 5:28
 "Catalina Sunset" (J. Norum, Billy White) – 5:20 
 "Half Way Home" (J. Norum, K. Keeling) – 5:20 
 "Healing Rays" (J. Norum, K. Keeling) – 3:06 
 "Jillanna" (J. Norum, B. White) – 3:35

Personnel
John Norum – vocals, guitars
Kelly Keeling – vocals, keyboards
Tom Lilly – bass guitar
Gary Ferguson – drums

Album credits 
John Norum - producer
Wyn Davis - producer, engineer

References

John Norum albums
1995 albums
CBS Records albums